The Opel Super 6 is an executive car which was built by the German car manufacturer Opel between 1937 and late 1938. It was available in three different versions: a 4-door sedan, a 2-door coupé, and a 2-door cabriolet.

The  produces  at 3500 rpm. In total, 46,453 Opel Super Six were built in the two years it was available.

An interesting detail was the windscreen wiper drive which received its power via a mechanical linkage from the camshaft, a solution which Opel continued to use in post-World War II Rekord models until 1957.

Sources

External links

Super 6
1930s cars
Cars introduced in 1937